George Winston Roddick,  (born 2 October 1940 in Caernarfon) is a Welsh barrister, and the former North Wales Police and Crime Commissioner. At the time he was a member of the Liberal Democrats, but ran as an independent and on election resigned from the Party. Roddick was the first person to hold the post.

Early life
Roddick was born and raised in Caernarfon, educated at the Royal Naval School Tal-Handaq, Malta and the Sir Hugh Owen Grammar School, Caernarfon.

After training and working as a police officer in Liverpool, he undertook a law degree at University College, London.

Career

Legal career
He then trained as a barrister, appointed to the bar in 1968, and then became a Crown Court recorder. One of Wales's leading barristers, he took silk in 1986, and was appointed as the first Counsel General for Wales in 1998, the most senior legal adviser to the Welsh Assembly, during which time he advised on the creation and legislative passing of the Welsh Language Act 1993.

Political career
Roddick has twice stood for the Liberal Party unsuccessfully in Parliamentary elections: in Anglesey at the 1970 general election, and in Cardiff South and Penarth in 1983. He also served as Chairman of the Welsh Liberal Party in the early 1980s.

Police and Crime Commissioner
In November 2012, he sought election as the Police and Crime Commissioner for North Wales Police, beating Labour's Tal Michael on the second count. After his election, he was criticised for running as an independent even though he is a member of the Liberal Democrats, with the Welsh Labour Party accusing him of 'hiding' his allegiance for political reasons. Roddick stood down at the 2016 elections and the seat was won by Arfon Jones of Plaid Cymru.

Other
In 1997, Roddick was appointed a member of the Independent Television Commission, and between 2004 and 2012 was a member of the S4C Authority.

Personal life
He is a member of the Gorsedd of Bards, patron of Caernarfon Rugby Club, an Honorary Life Member of Caernarfon Town F.C. Supporters Club, the Honorary President of GISDA (Gwynedd charity for homeless young people), and the Vice President of the Caernarfon Male Voice Choir.

Honours
Roddick is a Companion of the Order of the Bath, and  an Honorary Fellow of the University of Aberystwyth.

References

External links
Professional profile
Personal website
Bio at Debretts

Living people
Liverpool City Police officers
People from Caernarfon
Welsh police officers
Welsh barristers
21st-century Welsh lawyers
20th-century Welsh lawyers
Police and crime commissioners in Wales
Welsh King's Counsel
Alumni of University College London
Welsh civil servants
20th-century King's Counsel
Companions of the Order of the Bath
Bards of the Gorsedd
1940 births
Liberal Democrats (UK) people
Independent police and crime commissioners
Liberal Party (UK) parliamentary candidates